0.01 may refer to:

 Hundredth
 0.01 (album), the debut album by H3llb3nt

See also
 Orders of magnitude (numbers)#10−2